Montespan is a commune in the Haute-Garonne department of southwestern France.

Population

Sights
The remains of a 13th-century castle, the Château de Montespan, have been listed since 1926 as a historic site by the French Ministry of Culture.

See also
Communes of the Haute-Garonne department

References

Communes of Haute-Garonne